Vladislav Koutský (born April 19, 1985) is a Czech professional ice hockey goalie. He is currently playing for HC Spartak Choceň of the FFHG Division 1.

Koutský made his Czech Extraliga debut playing with HC Dynamo Pardubice during the 2003-04 Czech Extraliga season.

References

External links

1985 births
Living people
HC Dynamo Pardubice players
HC Oceláři Třinec players
Czech ice hockey goaltenders
People from Hronov
Sportspeople from the Hradec Králové Region
Czech expatriate ice hockey players in Slovakia
Expatriate ice hockey players in France
Czech expatriate sportspeople in France